ChemPhysChem is a biweekly peer-reviewed scientific journal published by Wiley-VCH on behalf of Chemistry Europe. It was established in 2000 and covers all aspects of chemical physics and physical chemistry. Initially published monthly, the journal moved to 18 issues per year in 2007, and further to biweekly in 2016.

Abstracting and indexing
The journal is abstracted and indexed by:

Cambridge Structural Database
Chemical Abstracts Service
Current Contents/Physical, Chemical & Earth Sciences
Index Medicus/MEDLINE/PubMed
Inspec
PASCAL
Science Citation Index Expanded 
Scopus
VINITI Database RAS

According to the Journal Citation Reports, the journal has a 2021 impact factor of 3.520.

References

External links

Chemistry Europe academic journals
Physical chemistry journals
English-language journals
Publications established in 2000
Wiley-VCH academic journals
Biweekly journals